Georgios Karatzaferis (born August 11, 1947) is a Greek politician, a former member of the Hellenic Parliament and the president of the Popular Orthodox Rally. Previously, Karatzaferis was a member of parliament of the liberal-conservative New Democracy party. He is a former Member of the European Parliament and former vice-president of the Independence and Democracy group. His party's views, ideas, and electoral campaigns are often broadcast and promoted by the relatively minor private Greek TV channel TeleAsty (former Telecity), which he founded and owns. The party's ideas are also disseminated in the party's weekly newspaper, A1.

Biography and career
Karatzaferis was born in 1947. In 1977 he founded R.TV.P.R. AE advertising body and he created the TV Press Video Review in 1983. In 1990 he established the radio and television stations Radio City and TeleAsty (the latter was initially known as TeleCity).

He received an honours diploma from the London School of Journalism in 1994. He became an editor of the newspaper Alpha Ena in 2000. In the beginning of the 1980s he was also a columnist for Nea Poreia, the official publication of the political organization to which he belonged and was an MP. He also wrote contributed to daily newspapers including Eleftheros, Apogevmatini, and Eleftheros Typos. In 2005, he founded the Academy of Communications Studies in Athens.

As a member of the Greek Parliament his responsibilities included the chairmanship of the Parliamentary Watchdog Committee, the Public Order Committee and the Press and Mass Media Committee (1993–2000). He was a member of the Committees on Public Administration and Foreign Affairs (1993–2004), Member of the National Communications' Confidentiality Protection Committee and Vice-Chairman of the Greco Spanish Friendship Association (1999)..

Controversy
On different controversial remarks, Georgios Karatzaferis has publicly questioned why Jews did not "come to work on 9/11", suggesting that they were warned to leave the World Trade Center prior to the attack. He challenged the Israeli ambassador in Greece to come and debate on "the Holocaust, Auschwitz and the Dachau myth" and in 2001 he stated that "the Jews have no legitimacy to speak in Greece and provoke the political world. Their impudence is crass".

Books
Karatzaferis is also the author of five books which are the following:

 Το Μοντέλο της Δημοκρατίας - The Model of Democracy
 Η Γυναίκα Σήμερα - The Woman of Today
 Η Λιάνη στηρίζει την Aλλαγή - Liani supports the Change
 Αγώνες και Αγωνίες της δεκαετίας 1990-2000 - Struggles and Agonies of the 1990–2000 decade
 Βίοι Αγίων - Biographies of Saints
 Η Λευκή Βίβλος - The White Bible

References

External links

 Official Website
European Parliament Biographical Record

1947 births
Living people
Greek MPs 1993–1996
Greek MPs 1996–2000
Greek MPs 2000–2004
Greek MPs 2007–2009
Greek journalists
Greek bodybuilders
Politicians from Athens
Popular Orthodox Rally politicians
New Democracy (Greece) politicians
Greek anti-communists
Antisemitism in Greece
Alumni of the London School of Journalism